This is a list of airlines which have an Air Operator Certificate issued by the General Department of Civil Aviation of Armenia.

Scheduled airlines

Charter airlines

Cargo airlines

See also

List of airlines
List of airlines of Europe
List of airports in Armenia
List of the busiest airports in Armenia
List of defunct airlines of Armenia
List of defunct airlines of Europe
Transport in Armenia

References

 
Airlines
Armenia
Airlines
Armenia
Armenia